This is a list of independent television stations in the United States, ordered by state and city of license. Eventually, there will be links to and articles on each of the stations, describing their local programming, hosts and technical information, such as broadcast frequencies.

The station's advertised channel number follows the call letters. In most cases, this is their over-the-air broadcast frequency.

Excluded from this list are satellite stations and affiliates of secondary television networks. Independent stations with secondary affiliations to major networks, however, are included.

United States

Alabama

Arizona

California

Florida

Georgia

Hawaii

Illinois

Indiana

Kansas

Louisiana

Maryland

Massachusetts

Michigan

Minnesota

Mississippi

Montana

Nebraska

Nevada

New Jersey

New Mexico

New York

North Carolina

Ohio

Oklahoma

Pennsylvania

South Carolina

Tennessee

Texas

Utah

Virginia

Washington

Wisconsin

U.S Territories

Puerto Rico

U.S. Virgin Islands

References

See also
Independent station (North America)